Almog Cohen may refer to:
 Almog Cohen (footballer)
 Almog Cohen (politician)